George Matthew Pesut (born June 17, 1953) is a Canadian former professional ice hockey player. He played in 92 NHL games for the California Golden Seals over two seasons. He also played in 17 WHA games with the Calgary Cowboys during the 1976–77 season. The rest of his career was mainly spent in the minor leagues and in Europe.

Early years

George Pesut was born in City Hospital in Saskatoon, Saskatchewan, Canada, a product of a second marriage, both parents of Croatian descent. His birth parents met in Saskatoon, Saskatchewan after both had divorced their Croatian partners. His father, after being released after WW2 from the Esterwegen concentration camp, a brutal, Nazi-run prisoner of war facility, could not convince his wife at the time, to accompany him on moving to Canada to establish a new life. He then left her to begin anew as a Canadian, and settled in the Canadian province of Saskatchewan. Pesut's mother on the other hand, had originally married a man of Croatian heritage from Chicago, USA, and they had moved to Hanley, Saskatchewan. They divorced shortly after they were married, at which time Pesut's mother moved to the larger centre Saskatoon where more opportunity and jobs existed. His birth parents both had grown up in the Lika region of Croatia, one town apart in their native country, but had met some 5000 miles away in Canada for the first time.

Pesut began his hockey career in the province of Saskatchewan, Canada, in the city of Saskatoon. He played his minor hockey in the Saskatoon system and eventually began his junior career with the A level Saskatoon Macs of the Saskatchewan Junior Hockey League. A strapping, lanky defenseman, Pesut, at the age of 18, entered the major junior hockey ranks in the 1971–72 season with the Victoria Cougars which was a member of the Western Canada Hockey League, now called the WHL, one of the three the major junior leagues for professional draft eligible players in Canada. The WHL represented the best junior players in Western Canada, the others being the OHL (Ontario Hockey League) and the QMJHL (Quebec Major Junior Hockey League).  
As a defensive specialist, Pesut played 38 games for the Cougars notching 16 points before being traded to the Flin Flon Bombers in the same season. With the Bombers, Pesut played another 25 games, adding another 11 points to his scoring total, before being traded once again in the 1971-72 WCHL season to the Saskatoon Blades, the major junior team in his hometown. He joined the likes of future NHLers such as Ralph Klassen, Dennis Abgrall, Bob Bourne, Larry Sacharuk, Dave Lewis and Fred Williams. and He finished the season playing 2 games for the Blades, and returned to the team in the '72-'73 season where in his amateur draft year, he played 68 games and recorded his highest scoring total in his WCHL career with 37 points, 12 of which were goals, an impressive feat for a defenseman. He was selected for the WCHL's first team all-star honors in 1973.

Professional career
In spite of entering major junior hockey late, and only playing 2 full seasons in major junior, Pesut was highly regarded by National Hockey League and World Hockey Association scouts. His defensive "rough and tumble" no nonsense style play was appealing to the pro teams at the time, along with his 6-foot plus frame, and his patented,  smooth, "turn on a dime" skating ability. His hard shot and precision from the blue-line were all attributes which afforded him a high placing within the draft rankings in the upcoming 1973-74 NHL and WHA amateur drafts. Pesut also had shown prospective pro teams that he also could provide much needed offense as a rushing defenseman, putting up 37 points in his draft year while still in junior with the Saskatoon Blades. He was also noted as a fearless opponent who took on many of the WCHL's agitators and enforcers, and was known to NHL teams as player who  never backed down in support of his teammates. Consequently, he fought many of the NHL enforcers during his stint on various teams in the National Hockey League.

As a result of his good play-making ability and toughness, George Pesut was drafted early in the second round at #24 of the 1973 NHL Amateur Draft by St. Louis Blues. Pro scouts had him rated much higher than many upcoming NHLers in the draft and he was selected ahead of other illustrious defensemen of that year, notably Colin Campbell, who was selected later in the second round by the Pittsburgh Penguins, and Pesut's junior teammate Dave Lewis selected in the third round by the New York Islanders. Both went on to lengthy careers in the NHL.  At the same time, Pesut was also drafted by the fledgling World Hockey Association's Cleveland Crusaders, at exactly the same draft position as he had been drafted in the NHL, an unusual feat which provided prospective teams with a consistent analysis of his abilities. However, Pesut opted begin his professional career in the NHL and to accept a contract offer with the Blues.  He was offered a similar contract which he declined, by the World Hockey Associations' Cleveland Crusaders, who retained his professional rights.

After attending the St. Louis Blues training camp in 1973, he was sent down to begin and develop his pro career with the Blue's minor league affiliate, the Denver Spurs in the Western Hockey League. In Denver, he played only 7 games before being traded in November 1973 to the Philadelphia Flyers for Bob Stumpf a defenseman who was a later draft pick in the same draft year as Pesut. He was put on Philadelphia's opening night roster as the only rookie to make the squad, where he recounted in subsequent interviews the surprising, raucous standing ovation from the Philadelphia fans, welcoming the team back after the previous seasons' Stanley Cup win. Following the exhibition season, he was sent to the Flyers AHL affiliate, the Richmond Robins for his continued professional development and to bolster a weak defensive corp for the remainder of the '73-'74 season. He managed 10 points in his first pro season, splitting 45 games between the Spurs and the Robins.
At the start of the 1974-'75 NHL season, Pesut attended the Flyer's training camp and played the exhibition schedule with the team, prior to being sent back to the Richmond Robins to start the season. After playing only 8 games with the Robins, Pesut was traded by the Flyers on December 8, 1974, to the California Golden Seals in exchange for the professional rights to centreman Ron Chipperfield, who was playing for the Vancouver Blazers in the WHA at the time.

The 1974-75 NHL season saw Pesut report to the California Golden Seals training camp and once again in his career, make the team's opening night roster. In his first full NHL season, Pesut put up a respectable 13 points in 47 games with the Golden Seals, a team which had been struggling as a bonafide NHL team since its inaugural season in 1967. The Golden Seals was primarily assembled from numerous off season trades and first round draft picks, with one of the youngest rosters in the NHL. The young team allowed Pesut to play alongside first year NHL defensemen and first round draft picks like the 18 year old Rick Hampton, who was selected third overall in the 1974 NHL amateur draft. Pesut, was also in good company on the Seal's blueline, coupled with much needed NHL mentorship from 32 year old, storied defenseman, Jim Neilson aka the "Chief". Neilson had played the previous 12 seasons with the New York Rangers and had clocked 1,058 total games in the NHL and World Hockey Association, 1,023 of those games in the NHL.

In 1975–76, Pesut, while still under contract with the Seals, was sent to their minor league Central Hockey League affiliate, the Salt Lake Golden Eagles to start the season. He was called back up to the Seals after 7 games with the Golden Eagles where he notched two goals during his brief stint with the team. During the remainder of the season, he played in 45 NHL games with the Seals, where he put up another 3 goals and 9 assists for a 12-point run. Although the team was filled with young talent, the Seals did not make the playoffs either year Pesut played for them, winning only 46 games total in both seasons, surely a disappointment for fans, along with the distinction of having the lowest attendance figures in the NHL, even worse than the soon to be defunct, Kansas City Scouts. The following year included the California Golden Seals moving the struggling team to Cleveland to become the Cleveland Barons for the '76-77 NHL season. At this time, Pesut made the decision to not to join the Barons, and instead leave the NHL for the twelve-team World Hockey Association where the Calgary Cowboys offered him a lucrative contract to jump professional leagues. He also saw the opportunity to play with numerous other NHLers who jumped leagues at the time, including superstars Bobby Hull and Anders Hedberg who were toiling with the Winnipeg Jets. Wearing #2, Pesut logged 17 games for two goals and two total points before injury put him on the sidelines. In the '77-78 season, Pesut signed contracts in the European Leagues, where for three seasons, he played for HC Davos, EHC Dubendorf, EHC Chur in the Swiss and German Elite Pro Leagues.

In the 1980–81 season, he resurfaced back in North America on  the comeback trail, being offered a tryout from the NHL's Edmonton Oilers. After he had an outstanding training camp, the Oilers and Pesut were faced with a numbers game of good available defensemen. At the time, the Oilers' overall depth on the blueline with the likes of top players such as Paul Coffey, Lee Fogolin and Kevin Lowe shoring up the defensive corps, was one of the best defence squads in the NHL. As a result, Pesut was the odd man out, and eventually signed a one-year contract with the Oilers' farm team, the Wichita Wind, in the Central Hockey League where back in old form, he put up 3 goals and 21 assists with the Wind, for a total of 27 points.

Life in the Bay Area

During the off-season with the Golden Seals, Pesut was the only member of the squad to live in the Bay Area, where he forged many friendships and relationships with locals and celebrities alike, including the Smothers Brothers. A well-rounded athlete in his own right, Pesut represented professional hockey and the Golden Seals in a televised event, the "Bay Area Decathlon" which featured many superstar professional athletes from all sports competing against each other in basketball, football, tennis and other sports. Pesut's opportunity to throw footballs against NFL greats such as Jim Plunkett, Dan Fouts and the #1 NFL draft pick in 1975, Steve Bartkowski, showcased an all round talent for sports including Pesut's tennis victory in the decathlon over Rick Barry, the NBA scoring champ in 1975. During his tenure in the Bay Area, Pesut also took up tennis, a game of which he excelled in and continues to play at a very high level, today.

Career statistics

Regular season and playoffs

Awards, honors and accomplishments

Best Defenceman Award Western Canada Hockey League (WCHL Major Junior) 1972–73 season;
WCHL All-Star Team, 1972–73;
Voted the Best Defenceman in Swiss hockey three consecutive seasons;
German Championship winner with Berlin, first team All-star for consecutive seasons in Germany.
American television appearances such as the "Bay Area Decathlon", a 70's American reality series featuring professional athletes.
Numerous German television appearances including sports and personal interviews.
Fluent in additional languages, including German and Croatian.

External links

1953 births
Living people
Berliner SC players
Calgary Cowboys players
California Golden Seals players
Canadian expatriate ice hockey players in Switzerland
Canadian expatriate ice hockey players in the United States
Canadian ice hockey defencemen
Canadian people of Croatian descent
Chamonix HC players
Cleveland Crusaders draft picks
Denver Spurs players
ECD Iserlohn players
ECD Sauderland players
EHC Bayreuth players
Erie Blades players
HC Davos players
Ice hockey people from Saskatchewan
Kassel Huskies players
Richmond Robins players
Salt Lake Golden Eagles (CHL) players
Saskatoon Blades players
Sportspeople from Saskatoon
St. Louis Blues draft picks
Tidewater Sharks players
Victoria Cougars (WHL) players
Wichita Wind players